"La vie sait" is a song by French singer Priscilla Betti. Released as a digital single on January 27, 2017, it reached number 109 in France.

The song is part of Priscilla Betti's sixth studio album, also titled La vie sait, that appeared later in the same year (on May 19, 2017).

Track listing

Charts

References 

2017 songs
2017 singles
Priscilla Betti songs
Universal Music Group singles
Songs written by Nazim Khaled